Thomas Asnip (18 February 1883 – 24 July 1918) was an English amateur footballer who played in the Football League for Lincoln City as an outside forward.

Personal life 
Asnip served in the Royal Lincolnshire and North Staffordshire Regiments during the First World War and was serving as a lance sergeant when he was killed in West Flanders on 24 July 1918. He is buried in No. 10 Cemetery in Loker.

Career statistics

References

1883 births
1918 deaths
Footballers from Sheffield
English footballers
Association football outside forwards
Lincoln City F.C. players
English Football League players
British Army personnel of World War I
Royal Lincolnshire Regiment soldiers
British military personnel killed in World War I
North Staffordshire Regiment soldiers
Military personnel from Sheffield